Ribautodelphax is a genus of true bugs belonging to the family Delphacidae.

The species of this genus are found in Eurasia and Northern America.

Species:
 Ribautodelphax affinis Logvinenko, 1970 
 Ribautodelphax albostriata (Fieber, 1866)

References

Delphacidae